Domenico is an Italian given name for males and may refer to:

People

 Domenico Alfani, Italian painter
 Domenico Allegri, Italian composer
 Domenico Alvaro, Italian mobster
 Domenico Ambrogi, Italian painter
 Domenico Auria, Italian architect
 Domenico del Barbieri, Florentine artist
 Domenico di Bartolo, Italian painter
 Domenico Bartolucci, Italian Roman Catholic cardinal
 Domenico di Pace Beccafumi, Italian painter
 Domenico Pignatelli di Belmonte, Italian Roman Catholic cardinal
 Domenico Berardi, Italian footballer
 Domenico Bernini, son of Gian Lorenzo Bernini
 Domenico Bidognetti, Italian criminal
 Domenico Bollani, Venetian diplomat and politician
 Domenico Canale, Italian-American distributor
 Domenico Caprioli, Italian painter
 Domenico Caruso, Italian poet and writer
 Domenico Cefalù, Italian-American mobster
 Domenico Cimarosa, Italian composer
 Domenico Cirillo, Italian physician and patriot
 Domenico Colombo, father of Christopher Columbus
 Domenico Comino, Italian politician
 Domenico Condello, Italian mobster
 Domenico Corcione, Italian general
 Domenico Cotugno, Italian physician
 Domenico Criscito, Italian footballer
 Domenico Crivelli, British singer
 Domenico De Sole, Italian businessman
 Domenico della Rovere, Italian Roman Catholic cardinal
 Domenico dell'Allio, Italian architect
 Domenico Di Carlo, Italian football coach
 Domenico Dolce, Italian fashion designer
 Domenico Fetti, Italian painter
 Domenico Fisichella, Italian academic and politician
 Domenico Fontana, Italian Renaissance architect
 Domenico Gabrielli, Italian composer and cello player
 Domenico Gagini, Italian sculptor
 Domenico Gallo, Italian composer
 Domenico Gargiulo, Italian painter
 Domenico Gattilusio, ruler of Lesbos
 Domenico Ghirlandaio, Italian painter
 Domenico Ghislandi, Italian painter
 Domenico Giannace, Italian politician
 Domenico Gilardi, Italian architect
 Domenico Ginnasi, Italian Roman Catholic cardinal
 Domenico Gnoli, several
 Domenico Grimani, Italian Roman Catholic cardinal
 Domenico Guglielmini, Italian scientist
 Domenico Leccisi, Italian politician
 Domenico Losurdo, Italian Marxist philosopher
 Domenico Lucano, Italian politician
 Domenico Maggiotto, Italian painter
 Domenico Meldolesi, Italian cyclist
 Domenico di Michelino, Italian painter
 Domenico Michiel, Doge of Venice
 Domenico Millelire, Italian patriot
 Domenico Modugno, Italian singer, actor and politician
 Domenico Montagnana, Italian master luthier
 Domenico Maria Muratori, Italian painter
 Domenico Mustafà, Italian singer and composer
 Domenico Quaglio the Elder, Italian painter
 Domenico Quaglio the Younger, German painter
 Domenico Padovano, Italian Roman Catholic prelate
 Domenico Passignano, Italian painter
 Domenico da Piacenza, Italian Renaissance dancing master
 Domenico Piola, Italian painter
 Domenico Pellegrini, several
 Domenico Riccio, Italian painter
 Domenico Rosselli, Italian sculptor
 Domenico Rossi, several
 Domenico Savino, Italian conductor
 Domenico Scarlatti, Italian composer
 Domenico Starnone, Italian writer
 Domenico Tedesco, Italian-German football manager
 Domenico Tintoretto, Italian painter
 Domenico Trezzini, Swiss-Italian architect
 Domenico Maria Viani, Italian painter
 Domenico Zampaglione, Italian footballer
 Domenico Zipoli (1688–1726), Italian composer and Jesuit missionary.

"Domenico" as a surname
 Daniel D. Domenico, American federal district judge
 Di Domenico brothers, Italian film directors

Other

See also
Dominic
Domenic

Italian masculine given names
Sammarinese given names